The Clarksville Fox is a football team in the Independent Women's Football League. Based in Clarksville, Tennessee, the Fox play their home games on the campus of Northwest High School.

History

2007
The Fox were formed in 2007 as a member of the Women's Football League.  Their inaugural season was successful, finishing 4-2 on the regular season and earning a berth in the Championship Game, where the Fox lost to the Jacksonville Dixie Blues by a score of 49-6.

2008
After the WFL went moribund, the Fox applied for, and were subsequently accepted into, full membership in the IWFL.  Playing in the Tier II Mid-South Division alongside the Shreveport Aftershock and Louisiana Fuel, the Fox finished 7-1 and won the Mid-South Division title and a spot in the Tier II playoffs.  Following their 32-0 victory over the New England Intensity in the semifinals, the Fox advanced to the IWFL Tier II Championship Game, where they lost 29-6 to the Montreal Blitz.

Season-by-season 

|-
| colspan="6" align="center" | Clarksville Fox (WFL)
|-
|2007 || 4 || 3 || 0 || 2nd League || Lost WFL Championship (Jacksonville)
|-
| colspan="6" align="center" | Clarksville Fox (IWFL2)
|-
|2008 || 8 || 2 || 0 || 1st Southern Mid South || Won IWFL2 Semifinal (New England)Lost IWFL2 Championship (Montreal)
|-
|2009 || 4 || 4 || 0 || 17th IWFL2 || --
|-
|2010 || 5 || 3 || 0 || 3rd Western Midwest || --
|-
| colspan="6" align="center" | Clarksville Fox (IWFL)
|-
|2011 || 3 || 5 || 0 || 3rd Eastern Mid South || --
|-
!Totals || 24 || 17 || 0
|colspan="2"| (including playoffs)

Season schedules

2009

2010

References

External links
 Clarksville Fox official website
 IWFL official website

Independent Women's Football League
Sports in Clarksville, Tennessee
American football teams in Tennessee
American football teams established in 2007
2007 establishments in Tennessee
Women's sports in Tennessee